Atlantis Chaos is a region of chaos terrain in the Phaethontis quadrangle of Mars. It is located around 34.7° south latitude, and 177.6° west longitude. It is encompassed by the Atlantis basin.

See also 
 List of areas of chaos terrain on Mars

References

External links 

Phaethontis quadrangle
Chaotic terrains on Mars